Giden is a small village in Çamlıyayla district of Mersin Province, Turkey. At  it a situated in Toros Mountains  to east of Çamlıyayla. The population of Giden was 792 as of 2012.

References

Villages in Çamlıyayla District